Dhurnal is a town and an administrative subdivision, of Chakwal District in the Punjab Province of Pakistan, it is part of Tehsil Lawa and is located at 32°47'60N 72°5'60E.

Education Hub

Universities
Allama Iqbal International Open University is establishing its campus in Dhurnal near Rati Dheri point in the mid of 2016. It would be only campus of AIOU even in the whole Chakwal District.

See also
 Chakwal

References

Populated places in Chakwal District